The Toyota Classic is a limited-production model produced by Toyota in 1996, and was styled after the Toyota AA of the 1930s-1940s (which was a visual copy of the Chrysler Airflow). Its interior was taken from a contemporary Toyota, but made more consistent with the car's exterior by the addition of wood to the dashboard and leather to the seats. (This was similar to the work carried out by companies such as Mitsuoka.) Toyota sold 100 of the cars and charged roughly US$75,000 for each of them.

The Classic arose as part of the boom in "retro-styled" cars, and also perhaps as a celebration of the 60th anniversary of the AA. The Origin of 2000 was a similar model resembling the first Crown.

External links
 
 

Classic
Retro-style automobiles
Rear-wheel-drive vehicles
Luxury vehicles
Sedans
Cars introduced in 1996
Executive cars